Evaristo Garbani-Nerini (26 October 1867 – 16 February 1944) was a Swiss politician and president of the Swiss National Council (1920/1921).

External links 

1867 births
1944 deaths
Federal Supreme Court of Switzerland judges
Members of the National Council (Switzerland)
Presidents of the National Council (Switzerland)
20th-century Swiss politicians